Like Mike is a 2002 American sports comedy film directed by John Schultz and written by Michael Elliot and Jordan Moffet. Starring Lil' Bow Wow, Morris Chestnut, Jonathan Lipnicki, Robert Forster, Crispin Glover and Eugene Levy, the film follows an orphan who gets basketball talents after finding an old pair of sneakers that once belonged to Michael Jordan.

It was produced by NBA Productions, and features cameo appearances by NBA players. The film was released on July 3, 2002, by 20th Century Fox, three years after Jordan left the Chicago Bulls, one year before Jordan retired for the third (and last) time from the NBA, and during his playing career with the Washington Wizards (Jordan's first retirement was 1993).

Despite receiving mixed reviews from critics, Like Mike was a moderate box office success, grossing $62.3 million worldwide against a $30 million budget. In later years, the film became a fan favorite among basketball fans.

Plot
Calvin Cambridge and his two best friends, Murph and Reg Stevens, live in an orphanage. Murph is the youngest of the trio, and has a very close bond with Calvin. At night they all have to sell chocolate for the troublesome orphanage director, Stan Bittleman, after each home game of the NBA team, the Los Angeles Knights (a parody of the Los Angeles Clippers). Calvin meets the team's coach, who is impressed by Calvin's knowledge of basketball and honesty about the chocolates, and offers Calvin tickets for the next game.

Inside a thrift store donation box, Calvin finds a pair of old sneakers with the initials "MJ" written on them; once worn by Michael Jordan. A jealous bully named Ox steals the sneakers and throws them onto an overhead power line. When Calvin tries to retrieve them that night during a rainstorm, he is shocked by a lightning bolt.

Calvin and his friends attend the basketball game between the Knights and the Minnesota Timberwolves. After the second quarter ends, the team's star player, Tracy Reynolds, prepares for a halftime contest. Calvin's ticket number is called and he goes one on one with Tracy. Calvin ends the contest with a slam dunk after bouncing the ball off the backboard. After a long moment of stunned silence, Calvin receives a standing ovation from Reg and the crowd. Calvin is signed to a one-day contract by the Knights and prepares for his first game with them, but realizes that he is not there to play. When the Knights play the San Antonio Spurs they start losing badly and Coach Wagner decides to let Calvin play in the fourth quarter. Calvin leads a comeback against the Spurs and they win, leading to Calvin getting a season contract. Reynolds becomes his mentor since Calvin is still a minor. Calvin brings teamwork to the Knights and makes them one of the best teams in the league.

Tracy starts to respect Calvin after he gets himself into trouble when making sure that Tracy does not miss his curfew. Bittleman signs a contract with the team that all of Calvin's money will go to him until Calvin is eighteen, or adopted. When the second option is about to become true, Bittleman grows desperate, steals Calvin's shoes and bets $100,000 against the Knights. After the kids convince Ox and his cohorts that Bittleman is selfish, Ox takes the shoes out of Bittleman's safe. The kids head to the arena with Calvin's sneakers. Bittleman escapes and sends goons after Calvin in a failed attempt to retrieve the shoes.

After the 3rd quarter ends with Vince Carter and the Toronto Raptors routing the Knights, 80-59, Calvin makes it back to the arena with the shoes. In the fourth and final quarter of the last regular season game, Calvin is put into the game by the coach and the Knights start to make a comeback. After a pile on towards the end of the game, Calvin's shoes are ruined with the Knights trailing the Raptors, 103-102. Without the shoes, and wanting to be a normal child, Calvin tells the team that, regardless of whether or not the Knights make the playoffs, it will be his last game. In the final play, Calvin manages to pump fake to get Carter to jump and pass the ball to Tracy. Tracy makes the game-winning shot at the final buzzer, and the Knights defeat the Raptors, 104-103, to clinch the Knights' first playoff appearance.

After going back to his orphanage, Calvin and Murph get adopted by Tracy, and Reg by a different family, though they stay in touch. Bittleman, not having the money to pay off the bet, goes into hiding (presumably to either avoid getting killed by his goons, or to avoid getting arrested by the Los Angeles Police Department), and the orphanage is now sponsored by the Knights.

Cast 

 Bow Wow as Calvin Cambridge
 Jonathan Lipnicki as Murph
 Brenda Song as Reg Stevens
 Morris Chestnut as Tracy Reynolds
 Eugene Levy as Frank Bernard
 Crispin Glover as Stan Bittleman
 Jesse Plemons as Ox
 Robert Forster as Coach Wagner
 Julius Charles Ritter as Marlon
 Anne Meara as Sister Theresa
 Fred Armisen as New Age Dad
 Julie Brown as New Age Mom
 Vanessa Williams as Pharmacist
 Reginald VelJohnson as Mr. Boyd 
 Valarie Pettiford as  Mrs. Boyd
 Reggie Theus and Geoff Witcher as the Knights Announcers
 Roger Morrissey as Marvin Joad
 Tucker Smallwood
 Sandra Prosper as Janet

NBA players 
 Vince Carter
 Michael Finley
 Steve Francis
 Allen Iverson
 Jason Kidd
 Desmond Mason
 Alonzo Mourning
 Tracy McGrady
 Steve Nash
 Dirk Nowitzki
 Gary Payton
 Jason Richardson
 David Robinson
 Gerald Wallace
 Rasheed Wallace
 Chris Webber

NBA reporters 
 Tom Tolbert
 Hannah Storm
 Ahmad Rashad
 Kenny Mayne
 Rich Eisen
 Pat Croce

Reception

Box office
Like Mike grossed $51.4 million in North America and $10.8 million overseas for a total worldwide gross of $62.3 million, against its budget of $30 million. The film opened fifth at the box office with a three-day gross of $12.2 million from 2,410 theaters, and $19 million over its five-day opening. The film was released in the United Kingdom on December 13, 2002, and opened on #4 with £246,169.

Critical response
On Rotten Tomatoes, the film has an approval rating of 57% based on 97 reviews, and an average rating of 5.5/10. The site's critical consensus reads, "A pleasant and innocuous diversion for kids, but adults may have trouble sitting through its predictable plotlines and schmaltz." On Metacritic, it has a score of 47 out of 100, based on 27 critics, indicating "mixed or average reviews". Audiences polled by CinemaScore gave the film an average grade of "A" on an A+ to F scale.

Ann Hornaday of The Washington Post wrote that the film depicted "frightening myths about adoption" that ultimately soured the comedy and acting chemistry between Bow Wow and Morris Chestnut.

Soundtrack

Standalone sequel and future
A direct to video stand-alone sequel titled, Like Mike 2: Streetball was released on June 6, 2006.

In September 2021, Bow Wow confirmed that a direct sequel to Like Mike was in the works with the film's original writer, Michael Elliot.

References

External links
 
 
 
 

2002 films
2002 comedy films
2000s children's comedy films
2000s fantasy comedy films
2000s sports comedy films
20th Century Fox films
American basketball films
American children's comedy films
American fantasy comedy films
American sports comedy films
2000s English-language films
20th Century Studios franchises
Films directed by John Schultz (director)
Films set in Los Angeles
Films scored by Richard Gibbs
Michael Jordan
NBA Entertainment films
2000s American films